"Cruisin' the Streets" is a disco song released in 1981 by the Boys Town Gang.

Song plot 
The extended version of the song includes a lengthy dialogue taking place at night in what is clearly implied to be Folsom Street in San Francisco. The dialogue consists of gay men cruising each other, discussing their sexual encounters and conversing with a female prostitute. At one point, a police car stops and three policemen step out and confront two men who are engaging in sexual activity as a female prostitute looks on. One of the officers asks the others what should be done, and the third officer states that he knows "just what to do to 'em" and from the subsequent noises it is implied that the officers are having sex with the prostitute and anal sex with the two men.

Track listing

References 

Disco songs
1981 songs
1981 singles
LGBT-related songs